Vạn Khánh is a commune and village in Vạn Ninh District, Khánh Hòa Province, in Southeast Vietnam. It is best known for being the homeplace of the Buddhist monk Thích Quảng Đức, who burned himself to death in 1963 to protest the anti-Buddhist discrimination of then-President of South Vietnam, Ngo Dinh Diem.

References

Populated places in Khánh Hòa province
Communes of Khánh Hòa province